Mariangela is a given name. It may refer to:

Mariangela Argentino (born 1984), Italian singer
Mariangela Demurtas (born 1981), Italian singer in the gothic metal band Tristania
Mariangela Melato (born 1941), Italian actress
Mariangela Wallimann-Bornatico (born 1948), Swiss jurist

See also 
55112 Mariangela (2001 QQ153), a Main-belt Asteroid discovered in 2001